Asiadapinae is a subfamily within the extinct primate family Notharctidae found in Asia during the early Eocene. They were very small and were some of the earliest adapiforms, similar to cercamoniines but also sharing features with sivaladapids.

References

Literature cited

 

Prehistoric strepsirrhines
Eocene primates
Eocene mammals of Asia
Fossil taxa described in 2009
Eocene first appearances
Eocene extinctions